Stephen Peter Borgatti is an American business professor and author, currently the Professor and Chellgren Endowed Chair of Corporate Strategy at the Gatton College of Business and Economics, University of Kentucky. His work is highly cited by peers and held in libraries worldwide.

References

External links
UKY Research profile

University of Kentucky faculty
American anthropologists
Brazilian emigrants to the United States
American non-fiction writers
1956 births
Boston College faculty
University of California, Irvine alumni
Cornell University alumni
University of South Carolina faculty
University of California, Riverside faculty
Living people
Place of birth missing (living people)
American male non-fiction writers